The frog family Dicroglossidae occurs in tropical and subtropical regions of Asia and Africa, with most genera and species being found in Asia. The common name of the family is fork-tongued frogs.

The Dicroglossidae were previously considered to be a subfamily in the family Ranidae, but their position as a family is now well established.

Subfamilies and genera
The two subfamilies contain 213 species in 13–15 genera, depending on the source.

Dicroglossinae Anderson, 1871 — 197 species in 12 genera:
 

Occidozyginae Fei, Ye, and Huang, 1990 — 16 species in two genera:
Ingerana Dubois, 1987 (four species)
Occidozyga Kuhl and Van Hasselt, 1822 (12 species)

Phylogeny
The following phylogeny of Dicroglossidae is from Pyron & Wiens (2011). Dicroglossidae is a sister group of Ranixalidae.

References